Paramesotriton zhijinensis is a species of salamander in the family Salamandridae. It is found only in Shuangyan Pond (26°40’N 105°46’ E), 1310 m, Zhijin County, Guizhou Province, People's Republic of China.

References

External links 
  [web application] 2008. Berkeley, California: Paramesotriton zhijinensis. AmphibiaWeb, available at https://web.archive.org/web/20040827082534/http://www.amphibiaweb.org/ (Accessed: May 7, 2010).

zhijinensis
Endemic fauna of China
Amphibians of China